Neocollyris similis is a species of ground beetle in the genus Neocollyris in the family Carabidae. It was described by Lesne in 1891.

References

Similis, Neocollyris
Beetles described in 1891